The 1973 Critérium du Dauphiné Libéré was the 25th edition of the cycle race and was held from 28 May to 4 June 1973. The race started in Thonon and finished at Saint-Étienne. The race was won by Luis Ocaña of the Bic team.

Teams
Ten teams, containing a total of 100 riders, participated in the race:

 
 Canada Dry–Gazelle
 
 
 
 
 La Casera

Route

General classification

References

1973
1973 in French sport
1973 Super Prestige Pernod
May 1973 sports events in Europe
June 1973 sports events in Europe